Delias bosnikiana is a butterfly in the family Pieridae. It was described by James John Joicey and Alfred Noakes in 1915. It is endemic to Biak in the Australasian realm.

References

External links
Delias at Markku Savela's Lepidoptera and Some Other Life Forms

bosnikiana
Butterflies described in 1915